Tarik Merzouk is a Moroccan footballer, who played for Sheikh Russel KC and other clubs.

Career

Club 
The midfielder played in his homeland for FAR Rabat, KAC Kenitra, and MAT Tétouan.

International 
Marzouk played for FAR in the 2007 CAF Champions League group stages.

References

1982 births
Living people
Moroccan footballers
AS FAR (football) players
Moroccan expatriate footballers
People from Kenitra
Expatriate footballers in Bangladesh
Sheikh Russel KC players
Moghreb Tétouan players
Association football forwards